Sir Henry Watson Parker,  (1 June 1808 – 2 February 1881) was Premier of New South Wales. He fitted into colonial society and politics in the era before responsible government, but his style was not suited to the democratic politics that began to develop in 1856.

Biography
Parker was the fourth son of Thomas Watson Parker and his wife Mary, née Cornell, of Lewisham, Kent, England. In order to improve his poor health, he joined the British East India Company and travelled to India, China and the Cape of Good Hope. Subsequently he toured France, Holland and Belgium, before securing employment in 1837 as private secretary to Sir George Gipps. In 1838 in this capacity he accompanied Gipps, now the incoming colonial Governor, to the Colony of New South Wales.
In 1843 Parker married Emmeline Emily, third daughter of John Macarthur, which further linked him to the conservative colonial establishment. 

In 1846 he was nominated by Gipps to become a member of the Legislative Council. In May of that year he was elected Chairman of Committees (Deputy presiding officer of the upper house) at a salary of £250 (raised to £500 in 1853), and continued to be re-elected to this position until the introduction of responsible government in 1856.

Parker was elected as member for Parramatta in the first Legislative Assembly and was a candidate for the speakership in May, but was defeated by one vote, with Daniel Cooper being elected. In September 1856 John Hay carried a vote of no-confidence in the Cowper ministry. He recommended to Governor William Denison that Parker would be the most likely man to conciliate parties, and that he should be asked to form a coalition government.

Premier
Parker offered seats in the cabinet to Cowper and Stuart Donaldson, the preceding premiers, but Cowper declined. In March 1857 Parker passed an act re-establishing the Sydney municipal council, and other useful legislation was also passed. It had been intended to bring in a land bill but the government was defeated on its electoral bill, and Parker resigned on 4 September 1857. In 1858 he returned to England. He does not appear to have ever revisited Australia, and died at Richmond, London, in 1881. He was survived by his wife, without issue, and left an estate of £140,000.

Honours
Parker was knighted in 1858 and created Knight Commander of the Order of St Michael and St George in 1877.

See also
 Parker ministry

Notes

1808 births
1881 deaths
Colonial Secretaries of New South Wales
Knights Bachelor
Knights Commander of the Order of St Michael and St George
English emigrants to colonial Australia
Premiers of New South Wales
Members of the New South Wales Legislative Assembly
19th-century Australian politicians